A gecko is a type of lizard of the taxonomic family Gekkonidae.

Gecko may also refer to:

Film and television
 Gaspar Le Gecko, a fictional character in the animated television series Brandy & Mr. Whiskers

Places
 Gecko, Louisiana, an unincorporated community, United States

Music
 "Gecko", a song by Tangerine Dream
 "Gecko" (song), a song by Oliver Heldens, later rereleased as "Gecko (Overdrive)" vs Becky Hill

Software
 Gecko (software), the open source web browser layout engine used in many applications developed by the Mozilla Foundation (notably Firefox and Thunderbird), as well as in many other open source software projects.
 GeckOS, an experimental operating system for MOS 6502 and compatible processors.

Theatre
 Gecko (theatre company), in London

Video games
 Gex (series), a video game series
 Gecko, a fictional location in Fallout 2
 Gecko is a nickname of Claude Speed in the video game Grand Theft Auto

Others
 The GEICO Gecko, an animated gecko appearing in GEICO insurance commercials
 SA-8 Gecko, the NATO reporting name for the Russian Antey 9K33 "Osa", a mobile short-range tactical surface-to-air missile system
 The HP 9000 712/60 and 80i workstations

See also 
 Gekko (disambiguation)